The 155th Division() was created in November 1948 under the Regulation of the Redesignations of All Organizations and Units of the Army, issued by Central Military Commission on November 1, 1948, basing on the 9th Independent Division of Northeastern People's Liberation Army,  formed in January.

The division was a part of 42nd Corps. Under the flag of 155th division it took part in the Chinese civil war. In April 1950 the division was disbanded, and its divisional HQ was re-organized as HQ of 8th Artillery Division.

As of disbandment the division was composed of:
463rd Regiment;
464th Regiment;
465th Regiment.

References

Infantry divisions of the People's Liberation Army
Military units and formations established in 1948
Military units and formations disestablished in 1950